Chris Combs (born December 15, 1976) is a former professional American football player who played defensive lineman in the National Football League (NFL) for the Pittsburgh Steelers and Jacksonville Jaguars over more than three years. He was drafted in the sixth round of the 2000 NFL Draft.

References

1976 births
Living people
American football defensive linemen
Duke Blue Devils football players
Jacksonville Jaguars players
Pittsburgh Steelers players
Sportspeople from Roanoke, Virginia